The Dominican Republic made its Paralympic Games début at the 1992 Summer Paralympics in Barcelona, with track and field athlete Rodolfo del Rosario as its sole representative. The country has competed in every subsequent edition of the Summer Paralympics, except 2000, but has never taken part in the Winter Paralympics. Dominican Republic delegations have never contained more than two competitors.

The country's best participation was at the 1992 Summer Paralympics in Barcelona and Madrid when Dominican athletes won 9 medals, 2 gold, 6 silver and one bronze.
The third gold medal The third gold medal was won 4 years later when Robert Jiménez won and broke the world record in the 200m event in the class T12 in athletics.

List of medallists

References